The 1969 Cork Senior Football Championship was the 81st staging of the Cork Senior Football Championship since its establishment by the Cork County Board in 1887. The draw for the opening round fixtures took place on 26 January 1969. The championship ran from 6 April to 26 October 1969.

Carbery entered the championship as the defending champions, however, they were beaten by St. Nicholas' in the quarter-finals.

The final was played on 26 October 1969 at the Athletic Grounds in Cork between University College Cork and St. Nicholas' in what was their first meeting in the final in six years. UCC won the match by 0-09 to 0-08 to claim their seventh championship title overall and their first title since 1964. It was their 7th championship title overall and their first title since 1964.

Teddy O'Brien was the championship's top scorer with 2-20.

Team changes

To Championship

Promoted from the Cork Intermediate Football Championship
 Cobh

Results

First round

Second round

Quarter-finals

Semi-finals

Final

Championship statistics

Top scorers

Overall

In a single game

References

Cork Senior Football Championship